Pimelea preissii is a species of flowering plant in the family Thymelaeaceae and is endemic to the southwest of Western Australia. It is an erect, spreading shrub with narrowly elliptic leaves arranged in opposite pairs, and compact clusters of many white or pink flowers surrounded by 4 green, egg-shaped involucral bracts.

Description
Flowering occurs from September to December.

Taxonomy
Pimelea preissii was first formally described in 1845 by Carl Meissner in Lehmann's Plantae Preissianae. The specific epithet (preissii) honours Ludwig Preiss.

Distribution and habitat
This pimelea mainly grows in woodland and forest between Wooroloo, Cape Leeuwin and the Bow River in the Avon Wheatbelt, Esperance Plains, Jarrah Forest, Mallee, Swan Coastal Plain and Warren bioregions of south-western Western Australia.

Conservation status
Pimelea preissii is listed as "not threatened" by the Western Australian Government Department of Biodiversity, Conservation and Attractions.

References

preissii
Malvales of Australia
Flora of Western Australia
Plants described in 1945
Taxa named by Carl Meissner